Rashaun Eneal Broadus (born August 5, 1984) is an American-born naturalized Albanian former professional basketball player. Born in Seattle, Washington, he attended Mililani High School in Mililani, Hawaii.

As a professional, Broadus played his rookie season with the Romanian team CSU Brașov. In the following years, he had stints in the top leagues of Ukraine and Lithuania, earning All-Star honors in the latter. Most notably, the point guard took part in the EuroCup with Lietuvos rytas in 2016. Broadus has also competed for MKS Dąbrowa Górnicza in Poland and with the German team Rasta Vechta of the ProA. More recently, he played with the St. John's Edge of the NBL Canada. He signed with BC Vytautas in Lithuania, and played with the Ball brothers, LaMelo Ball and LiAngelo Ball to finish the 2018 season.

Career statistics

Domestic Leagues

Regular season

|-
| 2011–12
| style="text-align:left;"| Šiauliai
| align=left | LKL
| 31 || 26.0 || .439 || .352 || .810 || 3.0 || 3.4 || 1.6 || 0.0 || 10.0
|-
| style="text-align:left;"|2012
| style="text-align:left;"| Edmonton Energy
| align=left | IBL
| 9  || 27.6 || .505 || .310 || .826 || 2.3 || 7.2 || 1.1 || 0.0 || 14.7
|-
| 2012–13
| style="text-align:left;"| Neptūnas Klaipėda
| align=left | LKL
| 29 || 23.1 || .434 || .274 || .628 || 2.7 || 2.9 || 1.3 || 0.0 || 9.0
|-
| 2014–15
| style="text-align:left;"| Juventus Utena
| align=left | LKL
| 49 || 30.4 || .397 || .293 || .774 || 3.7 || 3.7 || 1.4 || 0.0 || 13.5
|-
| 2015–16
| style="text-align:left;"| MKS Dąbrowa Górnicza
| align=left | PLK
| 31 || 33.4 || .434 || .313 || .716 || 3.5 || 4.1 || 1.0 || 0.0 || 16.0
|-
| 2016–17
| style="text-align:left;"| Lietuvos rytas Vilnius
| align=left | LKL
| 10 || 20.5 || .375 || .469 || .667 || 2.0 || 3.2 || 0.5 || 0.0 || 7.3
|-
| 2016–17
| style="text-align:left;"| Rasta Vechta
| align=left | BBL
| 16 || 21.7 || .423 || .277 || .667 || 1.8 || 4.3 || 1.3 || 0.1 || 8.6
|-
| 2017–18
| style="text-align:left;"| St. John's Edge
| align=left | NBLC
| 15 || 26.3 || .395 || .311 || .667 || 1.7 || 3.8 || 0.7 || 0.0 || 9.8
|-
|}

References

1984 births
Living people
Albanian men's basketball players
American men's basketball players
American expatriate basketball people in Canada
American expatriate basketball people in Germany
American expatriate basketball people in Lithuania
American expatriate basketball people in Poland
American expatriate basketball people in Romania
American expatriate basketball people in Ukraine
American sportspeople of Samoan descent
Basketball players from Hawaii
Basketball players from Seattle
BC Rytas players
BC Politekhnika-Halychyna players
BC Prienai players
BC Neptūnas players
BYU Cougars men's basketball players
MKS Dąbrowa Górnicza (basketball) players
Naturalized citizens of Albania
Point guards
St. John's Edge players
Western Nebraska Cougars men's basketball players